Late August at the Hotel Ozone is a 1967 Czechoslovak science fiction film by director Jan Schmidt based on a screenplay by Pavel Juráček.

Production 
Dana Medřická was originally considered for a role of Dagmar Hubertusová. The film was shot in an abandoned village near Mohelno.

Plot 
The film follows a group of young women who live in a post-apocalyptic world after nuclear war.

Cast 
Ondrej Jariabek as Old Man
Beta Poničanová as Dagmar Hubertusová
Magda Seidlerová as Barbora
Hana Vítková as Tereza
Jana Novaková	as Klára
Vanda Kalinová	as Judita
Natalie Maslovová as Magdaléna
Irena Lžičařová as Eva
Jitka Hořejšías Marta

Reception 
Late August at the Hotel Ozone was released in 1967. The New York Times wrote in 2014 "Gorgeously shot and devastatingly well told, the film echoes the hopelessness of certain World War II narratives of the era".

See also
List of apocalyptic films

References

External links 
 

1967 films
1960s Czech-language films
1967 drama films
Czechoslovak science fiction drama films
Czech post-apocalyptic films
Czech science fiction drama films